Career counseling is a type of advice-giving and support provided by career counselors to their clients, to help the clients manage their journey through life, learning and work changes (career). This includes career exploration, making career choices, managing career changes, lifelong career development and dealing with other career-related issues. There is no agreed definition of career counseling worldwide, mainly due to conceptual, cultural and linguistic differences. However, the terminology of 'career counseling' typically denotes a professional intervention which is conducted either one-on-one or in a small group. Career counseling is related to other types of counseling (e.g. marriage or clinical counseling). What unites all types of professional counseling is the role of practitioners, who combine giving advice on their topic of expertise with counseling techniques that support clients in making complex decisions and facing difficult situations.

Terminology
There is considerable variation in the terminology that is used worldwide to describe this activity. In addition to the linguistic variation between US English (counseling) and British English (counselling), there are also a range of alternate terms which are in common use. These include: career guidance; career coaching; guidance counseling; personal guidance; career consulting and a range of related terminologies. This frequently leads writers and commentators to combine multiple terms e.g. career guidance and counselling to be inclusive. However, care should be exercised when moving from one terminology to another as each term has its own history and cultural significance. An alternate term is 'career guidance'. This term is sometimes used as a synonym for career counseling, but can also be used to describe a broader range of interventions beyond one-to-one counseling.

History and new approaches 
Career counseling has a history going back at least as far as the late nineteenth century. An important defining work for the field was Frank Parsons' Choosing a Vocation which was published in 1909. Parsons was strongly rooted in the American progressive social reform movement, but as the field developed it moved away from this origin and became increasingly understood as a branch of counseling psychology.

While until the 1970s a strongly normative approach was characteristic for theories (e.g. of Donald E. Super's life-span approach) and for the practice of career counseling (e.g. concept of matching), new models have their starting point in the individual needs and transferable skills of the clients while managing biographical breaks and discontinuities. Career development is no longer viewed as a linear process which reflects a predictable world of work. More consideration is now placed on nonlinear, chance and unplanned influences.

This change of perspective is evident in the constructivist and social constructionist paradigms for career counseling. The constructivist/social constructionist paradigms are applied as narrative career counseling that emphasizes personal stories and the meaning individuals generate in relation to their education and work.

Postmodern career counseling is a reflective process of assisting clients in creating self through writing and revising biographical narratives taking place in a context of multiple choice from a diversity of options and constraints. The shift moves from emphasizing career-choice to empowering self-affirmation and improving decision-making. They have "shifted from a sole focus on the individual, to an explicit recognition of contextual factors, to a perspective that might be best described as a 'person-in-complex-social-and-economic-systems' focus." Postmodern career counseling theories include Mark Savickas's Career Construction Theory and Life Designing Paradigm as well as David Blustein's Psychology of Working Theory, which was developed to "address the roles that economic constraints and being marginalized could play in an individual’s choices, or lack of choices, about work, his or her ability to adapt to work, and ultimately in him or her finding decent work".

Recently this approach is widely applied in Australia such as in Athlete Career and Education (ACE) program by the Australian Sports Commission and Scope for artists by Ausdance.

Related professional activities 
Career counseling includes a wide variety of professional activities which help people deal with career-related challenges. Career counselors work with adolescents seeking to explore career options, experienced professionals contemplating a career change, parents who want to return to the world of work after taking time to raise their child, or people seeking employment. Career counselling is also offered in various settings, including in groups and individually, in person or by means of digital communication.

Several approaches have been undertaken to systemize the variety of professional activities related to career guidance and counseling. In the most recent attempt, the Network for Innovation in Career Guidance and Counselling in Europe (NICE) – a consortium of 45 European institutions of higher education in the field of career counseling – has agreed on a system of professional roles for guidance counselors. Each of these five roles is seen as an important facet of the career guidance and counselling profession. Career counselors performing in any of these roles are expected to behave professionally, e.g. by following ethical standards in their practice. The NICE Professional Roles (NPR) are: 
Career educators "suppor[t] people in developing their own career management competences"
Career information and assessment experts "suppor[t] people in assessing their personal characteristics and needs, then connecting them with the labour market and education systems"
Career counsellors "suppor[t] individuals in understanding their situations, so as to work through issues towards solutions"
Programme and service managers "ensur[e] the quality and delivery of career guidance and counselling organisations' services"
Social systems intervener and developers "suppor[t] clients (even) in crisis and works to change systems for the better"

The description of the NICE professional roles (NPR) draws on a variety of prior models to define the central activities and competences of guidance counselors.  The NPR can, therefore, be understood as a state-of-the-art framework which includes all relevant aspects of career counselling. For this reason, other models haven't been included here so far. Models which are reflected in the NPR include: 
 BEQU: "Kompetenzprofil für Beratende" (Germany, 2011)
 CEDEFOP "Practitioner Competences" (2009) 
 ENTO: "National Occupational Standards for Advice and Guidance" (Great Britain, 2006)
 IAEVG: "International Competences for Educational and Vocational Guidance" (2003) 
 Savickas, M.: "Career Counselling" (US, 2011)

Benefits and challenges

Benefits 
Empirical research attests the effectiveness of career counseling. Professional career counselors can support people with career-related challenges. Through their expertise in career development and labor markets, they can put a person's qualifications, experience, strengths and weakness in a broad perspective while also considering their desired salary, personal hobbies and interests, location, job market and educational possibilities. Through their counseling and teaching abilities, career counselors can additionally support people in gaining a better understanding of what really matters for them personally, how they can plan their careers autonomously, or help them in making tough decisions and getting through times of crisis. Finally, career counselors are often capable of supporting their clients in finding suitable placements/ jobs, in working out conflicts with their employers, or finding the support of other helpful services. It is due to these various benefits of career counseling that policy makers in many countries publicly fund guidance services. For example, the European Union understands career guidance and counseling as an instrument to effectively combat social exclusion and increase citizens' employability.

Challenges 
One of the major challenges associated with career counseling is encouraging participants to engage in the process. For example, in the UK 70% of people under 14 say they have had no careers advice while 45% of people over 14 have had no or very poor/limited advice.

In a related issue some client groups tend to reject the interventions made by professional career counselors preferring to rely on the advice of peers or superiors within their own profession. Jackson et al. found that 44% of doctors in training felt that senior members of their own profession were best placed to give careers advice. Furthermore, it is recognised that the giving of career advice is something that is widely spread through a range of formal and informal roles. In addition to career counselors it is also common for psychologists, teachers, managers, trainers and human resources (HR) specialists to give formal support in career choices.

Similarly it is also common for people to seek informal support from friends and family around their career choices and to bypass career professionals altogether. In the 2010s, increasingly people rely on career web portals to seek advice on resume writing and handling interviews and to do research on various professions and companies. It has also possible to get a vocational assessment done online.

Training 
There is no international standard qualification for professional career counselors, although various certificates are offered nationally and internationally (e.g. by professional associations). The number of degree programs in career guidance and/or career counseling is growing worldwide. The title "career counselor" is unregulated, unlike engineers or psychologists whose professional titles are legally protected. At the same time, policy makers agree that the competence of career counselors is one of the most important factors in ensuring that people receive high quality support in dealing with their career questions. Depending on the country of their education, career counselors may have a variety of academic backgrounds: In Europe, for instance, degrees in (vocational/ industrial/ organization) psychology and educational sciences are among the most common, but backgrounds in sociology, public administration and other sciences are also frequent. At the same time, many training programs for career counselors are becoming increasingly multidisciplinary.

Professional career guidance centers 
There are career guidance and counseling centers all over the world that give advice on higher studies, possibilities, chances and nature of courses and institutes. There are also services providing online counseling to people about their career or conducting psychometric tests to determine the person's aptitude and interests.

Career assessment 

Assessment tools used in career counseling to help clients make realistic career decisions.  These tools generally fall into three categories:  interest inventories, personality inventories, and aptitude tests.

Interest inventories are usually based on the premise that if you have similar interests to people in an occupation who like their job, you will probably like that occupation also. Thus, interest inventories may suggest occupations that the client has not thought of and which have a good chance of being something that the client will be happy with. The most common interest inventory is a measure of vocational interests across six domains: Realistic, Investigative, Artistic, Social, Enterprising, Conventional. People often report a mixture of these domains, usually with one predominant domain. Interests assessment tools include the Strong Interest Inventory, the Self-Directed Search, the Interest Profiler, the Campbell Interest and Skills Survey, the Kuder Career Search, and ACT's UNIACT.

Aptitude tests can predict with good odds whether a particular person will be able to be successful in a particular occupation.  For example, a student who wants to be a physicist is unlikely to succeed if he cannot do the math.  An aptitude test will tell him if he is likely to do well in advanced math, which is necessary for physics.  There are also aptitude tests which can predict success or failure in many different occupations.

Personality inventories are sometimes used to help people with career choice.  The use of these inventories for this purpose is questionable, because in any occupation there are people with many different personalities.  A popular personality inventory is the Myers–Briggs Type Indicator (MBTI).  It is based on Carl Jung's theory of personality, but Jung never approved it.  According to Jung most people fall in the middle of each scale, but the MBTI ignores this and puts everyone in a type category.  For example, according to the MBTI, everyone is either an extrovert or an introvert.  According to Jung, most people are somewhere in between, and people at the extremes are rare.  The validity of the MBTI for career choice is highly questionable.

In the United States 

In the United States, the designation, "career counselor" is not legally protected; that is, anyone can call themselves a career counselor. However, CACREP, the accrediting body for counselor education programs, requires that these programs include one course in career counseling as a part of the coursework for a master's degree in counseling.

The National Career Development Association (NCDA), the credentialing body for career counselors, provides various certifications for qualified career counselors. For those university-trained counselors or psychologists who have devoted a certain number of years to career counseling and taken specific coursework, it offers a Master Career Counselor (MCC) credential. The National Career Development Association is the only professional association of career counselors in the United States that provides certification in career counseling.

In Australia 
In Australia, there is no government regulation of the terms "career counsellor" or "career development practitioner". However, the peak body the Career Industry Council of Australia (CICA) sets standards for it's members.

CICA's Professional Standards for Australian Career Development Practitioners provide guidelines about appropriate qualifications and competencies for career counselling. CICA requires an endorsed Graduate Certificate or higher qualification for full membership.

The federal government's Australian Skills Quality Authority also endorses a "Certificate IV in Career Development" and a "Career Development Skill Set". The latter is intended to be completed by people with a Certificate III in a related field or equivalent experience.

In India 
In India, career counselling is a vast area of professional service, driven by factors like the huge talent availability in the country and the huge higher-education network (comprising graduate, post- graduate and multiple professional courses). There are many leading career-guidance centers in India. Leading bodies in India that drive policy-level initiatives for students and working professionals include:

 the Ministry of Human Resource Development (MHRD)
 the University Grants Commission (UGC)
 the All India Council of Technical Education (AICTE)
 the National Skill Development Corporation (NSDC)

among others.

In post-Soviet Eurasia 

"Professional orientation", as inherited from Soviet times, remains a widespread concept in the formerly Soviet republics - seen as an important and scientifically based approach to meeting the needs and aspirations of students and of the economy.
 Proforientatsiya is theoretically mandated in the Kyrgyz Republic at secondary and tertiary levels.

See also 
 Industrial and organizational psychology
 Careers Advisory Services
 Career guide
 Enneagram of Personality
 Holland Codes
 Career development
 Occupational Outlook Handbook
 Personality psychology
 Standard Occupational Classification System

References

Further reading 
 
 Galassi, J.P., Crace, R.K., Martin, G.A., James, R.M. & Wallace, R.L. (1992). Client preferences and anticipations in career counseling: A preliminary investigation. Journal of Counseling Psychology, 39, 46–55.
 Swanson, J.L. (1995). The process and outcome of career counseling. In W.B. Walsh & S.H. Osipow (Eds.), Handbook of vocational psychology: Theory, research and practice. (pp. 295–329). Mahwah, NJ: Erlbaum.
 Kim, B.S, Li, L.C., and Lian, C.T. (2002) Effects of Asian American client adherence to Asian cultural values, session goal, and counselor emphasis of client expression on career counseling process. Journal of Counseling Psychology, 49, 3, 342–354.
 
 

Counseling
Career advice services
Employment services